John Marcellus Richter  (February 8, 1873 – October 4, 1927) was a Major League Baseball third baseman. He played for the 1898 Louisville Colonels.

Sources

Major League Baseball third basemen
Louisville Colonels players
Baseball players from Kentucky
1873 births
1927 deaths
19th-century baseball players
St. Joseph Saints players
Quincy Browns players
Quincy Ravens players
Omaha Omahogs players
Burlington Colts players
Quincy Bluebirds players
Rochester Brownies players
Montreal Royals players
Wilkes-Barre Coal Barons players
Detroit Tigers (Western League) players
Columbus Senators players
Anderson Anders players
Hartford Indians players
Wooden Nutmegs players
Worcester Farmers players
Indianapolis Hoosiers (minor league) players